Daniel Gabriel Fahrenheit FRS (24 May 1686 – 16 September 1736) was a physicist, inventor, and scientific instrument maker. Born in Poland to a family of German extraction, he later moved to the Dutch Republic at age 15, where he spent the rest of his life (1701–1736). A pioneer of exact thermometry, he helped lay the foundations for the era of precision thermometry by inventing the mercury-in-glass thermometer and Fahrenheit scale.

Biography 
Fahrenheit was born in Danzig (Gdańsk), then in the Polish–Lithuanian Commonwealth, but lived most of his life in the Dutch Republic. The Fahrenheits were a German Hanse merchant family who had lived in several Hanseatic cities. Fahrenheit's great-grandfather had lived in Rostock, and research suggests that the Fahrenheit family originated in Hildesheim. Daniel's grandfather moved from Kneiphof in Königsberg (present-day Kaliningrad) to Danzig and settled there as a merchant in 1650. His son, Daniel Fahrenheit (the father of Daniel Gabriel), married Concordia Schumann, the daughter of a well-known Danzig business family. Daniel was the eldest of the five Fahrenheit children (two sons, three daughters) who survived childhood. His sister, Virginia Elisabeth Fahrenheit, married Benjamin Krüger and was the mother of Benjamin Ephraim Krüger, a clergyman and playwright.

Daniel Gabriel began training as a merchant in Amsterdam after both of his parents died on 14 August 1701 from eating poisonous mushrooms. However, Fahrenheit's interest in natural science led him to begin studies and experimentation in that field. From 1717, he traveled to Berlin, Halle, Leipzig, Dresden, Copenhagen, and also to his hometown, where his brother still lived. During that time, Fahrenheit met or was in contact with Ole Rømer, Christian Wolff, and Gottfried Leibniz. In 1717, Fahrenheit settled in The Hague as a glassblower, making barometers, altimeters, and thermometers. From 1718 onwards, he lectured in chemistry in Amsterdam. He visited England in 1724 and was the same year elected a Fellow of the Royal Society. From August 1736 Fahrenheit stayed in the house of Johannes Frisleven at Plein square in The Hague, in connection with an application for a patent at the States of Holland and West Friesland. At the beginning of September, he became ill and on the 7th his health had deteriorated to such an extent that he had notary Willem Ruijsbroek come to draw up his will. On the 11th the notary came by again to make some changes. Five days after that Fahrenheit died at the age of fifty. Four days later he received the fourth-class funeral of one who is classified as destitute, in the Kloosterkerk in The Hague (the Cloister or Monastery Church).

Fahrenheit scale 

According to Fahrenheit's 1724 article, he determined his scale by reference to three fixed points of temperature. The lowest temperature was achieved by preparing a frigorific mixture of ice, water, and a salt ("ammonium chloride or even sea salt"), and waiting for the eutectic system to reach equilibrium temperature. The thermometer then was placed into the mixture and the liquid in the thermometer allowed to descend to its lowest point. The second reference point was selected as the reading of the thermometer when it was placed in still water when ice was just forming on the surface.

Fahrenheit came up with the idea that mercury boils around 300 degrees on this temperature scale. Work by others showed that water boils about 180 degrees above its freezing point.  The Fahrenheit scale later was redefined to make the freezing-to-boiling interval exactly 180 degrees, a convenient value as 180 is a highly composite number, meaning that it is evenly divisible into many fractions. It is because of the scale's redefinition that normal mean body temperature today is taken as 98.6 degrees, whereas it was 96 degrees on Fahrenheit's original scale.

The Fahrenheit scale was the primary temperature standard for climatic, industrial and medical purposes in English-speaking countries until the 1970s, presently mostly replaced by the Celsius scale long used in the rest of the world, apart from the United States, where temperatures and weather reports are still broadcast in Fahrenheit.

See also
 Fahrenheit hydrometer
 List of German inventors and discoverers
 People from Gdańsk (Danzig)
 Anders Celsius

References

Further reading
 
 
  (Latin)
 
  (Czech)
 
 
 
  (Russian)

External links

 Letter from Daniel Gabriel Fahrenheit (scan) to Carl Linnaeus, 7 May 1736 n.s.,  
 
Fahrenheit's papers in the Royal Society Publishing 

1686 births
1736 deaths
Fellows of the Royal Society
17th-century Polish–Lithuanian Commonwealth people
Scientists from Gdańsk
Creators of temperature scales